The Montenegrin Derby (Montenegrin: Crnogorski derbi) is the main football match in Montenegro, between the teams from the two biggest Montenegrin cities. Rivals are FK Budućnost from Podgorica and FK Sutjeska from Nikšić, two most popular sports societies in Montenegro. The rivalry is present in football and basketball. 
Two clubs played their derbies in Montenegrin Championship, First League of SFR Yugoslavia, FR Yugoslavia and Serbia and Montenegro, and today, four times on one season, in Montenegrin First League.

History
FK Budućnost is founded at 1925, and FK Sutjeska at 1927. So, two teams played their matches before Second World Was. First matches in official competitions, Budućnost and Sutjeska played in Montenegrin Football Championship (1922-1940). First official game was played on 9 October 1932 in Nikšić, and Budućnost won 2–1. In period before Second World War, two teams played four official games - FK Budućnost under the name RSK Budućnost and FK Sutjeska under the name SK Hercegovac.
First derby after the War was held in April 1946, when the two clubs played matches in Montenegrin Republic League, for promotion to the inaugural season of the Yugoslav First League. Until now, there was 107 official games between Budućnost and Sutjeska.
As a match of main and strongest clubs from two biggest Montenegrin cities, derby became popular among the citizens from the early history. Some of the highest attendance in Montenegrin football were recorded at the games of Montenegrin Derby. From the 80's, both clubs have organised supporters groups, which gave to a Montenegrin Derby new and often a violent dimension.

Records and statistics

Head to head record

GD - Goals of Budućnost first

Biggest wins

Budućnost
 Home: Budućnost 7-1 Sutjeska, 1933, Montenegrin Football Championship (1922-1940)
 Away: Sutjeska 0-4 Budućnost, 2016, Montenegrin First League

Sutjeska
 Home: Sutjeska 5-2 Budućnost, 1963, Yugoslav Second League
 Away: Budućnost 1-4 Sutjeska, 2019, Montenegrin First League

Runs
 Most consecutive draws: 4 games, 2018-2019

Budućnost
 Longest unbeaten run: 17 games, 2000-2010
 Longest winning streak: 9 games, 1932-1953
 Longest run without conceded goal: 4 games, 2004-2007

Sutjeska
 Longest unbeaten run: 9 games, 2017-2019
 Longest winning streak: 3 games, 2017; 2018
 Longest run without conceded goal: 3 games, 1969-1971, 2017

Record by venue

Attendance
 Highest / Podgorica: 16,000, Budućnost - Sutjeska 3:0, Stadion pod Goricom, 1974
 Lowest / Podgorica: 700, Budućnost - Sutjeska 1:1, Stadion pod Goricom, 2018
 Highest / Nikšić: 12,000, Sutjeska - Budućnost 1:3, Stadion kraj Bistrice, 1975
 Lowest / Nikšić: 800, Sutjeska - Budućnost 1:2, Stadion kraj Bistrice, 2022

Attendance by venue

M = Number of matches (only matches with spectators counted); H = Highest attendance; L = Lowest attendance; Games played without spectators not included

Official games
During the history, through official competitions, Budućnost and Sutjeska played 104 official matches.

Head-to-head league results
Budućnost and Sutjeska were a part of Montenegrin football competitions since its early days. So, the teams played in the same competition levels during the most of the time. Before the World War II, football competitions in Montenegro existed as an elimination tournaments, so the very first leagues were organized since 1946. From that period, Budućnost and Sutjeska played in Yugoslav football system (1946-2006) and in Montenegrin First League (Prva CFL) since 2006.

Head-to-head ranking in Yugoslav football system (1946-2006)
Two teams often played in same competition levels during the era of SFR Yugoslavia, FR Yugoslavia and Federation of Serbia and Montenegro. They played together in first, second and third-tier competitions. Below are the final placements by both teams on every season when Budućnost and Sutjeska played in the same league.

Key

Head-to-head ranking in Prva CFL (2006-)
Since establishing of Prva CFL, Budućnost and Sutjeska played every single season in competition. Below are the final placements by both teams from 2006 to 2007 edition until today.

Key

Honours

FK Budućnost

National Championships – 5
 Montenegrin First League:
  Winners (5): 2007–08, 2011–12, 2016–17, 2019–20, 2020–21
  Runners-up (8): 2006–07, 2008–09, 2009–10, 2010–11, 2012–13, 2015–16, 2017–18, 2021–22
National Cups – 4
 Yugoslav Cup:
  Runners-up (2): 1964–65, 1976–77
 Montenegrin Cup:
  Winners (4): 2012–13, 2018–19, 2020–21, 2021–22
  Runners-up (3): 2007–08, 2009–10, 2015–16
Championships (1922-1940) – 4
 Montenegrin Championship (1922-1940)
  Winners (4): 1932, spring 1933, autumn 1933, 1934
  Runners-up (2): 1931, 1935
International – 1
 Intertoto Cup
  Group winners (1): 1981
 Balkans Cup:
  Runners-up (1): 1990–91

FK Sutjeska

National Championships – 5
 Montenegrin First League:
  Winners (5): 2012–13, 2013–14, 2017–18, 2018–19, 2021–22
  Runners-up (3): 2014–15, 2019–20, 2020–21
National Cups – 1
 Montenegrin Cup:
  Winners (1): 2016–17
  Runners-up (1): 2006–07
Championships (1922-1940)
 Montenegrin Championship (1922-1940)
  Runners-up (1): 1929

Supporters
One of crucial aspects of the Montenegrin Derby are the supporters. Supporters of Budućnost are named Varvari (Barbarians) and supporters of Sutjeska are Vojvode (The Dukes). Rivalry of ultras from Podgorica and Nikšić is presented on the football matches since their foundation. During recent history, there is strong ultras rivalry at the basketball matches, too.

Varvari Podgorica
Buducnost fans are known as Varvari (Barbarians), a group founded in 1987. The group's traditional colours are blue and white, which are also the colours of all the Budućnost sports clubs. For FK Budućnost Podgorica home games, Varvari occupy the northern stand (Sjever) of the Podgorica city stadium. They also have a reserved stand at the Morača Sports Center, as supporters of KK Buducnost basketball club.

Vojvode Nikšić
"The Dukes" (Vojvode) is the popular name for the most ardent Sutjeska supporters. They have been established as in 1988 in Nikšić and today constitute one of the most numerous groups of supporters in Montenegro. Their place is in the eastern stand, and they traditionally follow all the matches of all sports that compete under the Sutjeska name, both home and away matches.

See also
 Football in Montenegro
 Montenegrin First League
 FK Budućnost Podgorica
 FK Sutjeska Nikšić

References

External links
 Football Association of Montenegro - Official Site 
 League on soccerway.com

Association football rivalries
Montenegrin First League
FK Budućnost Podgorica
FK Sutjeska Nikšić
1932 establishments in Montenegro